Iqbal Mahmud (born 8 March 1940) is a Bangladeshi educator. He served as the 7th vice-chancellor of Bangladesh University of Engineering and Technology (BUET). And he is a former vice-chancellor of Bangladesh University of Engineering and Technology (BUET). He was awarded Ekushey Padak in 2005 by the Government of Bangladesh for his contribution to education.

Early life and education
Mahmud was born in Ramna, Dhaka on 8 March 1940. He passed matriculation examination from Sylhet Government High School in 1954 and intermediate examination in from Murarichand College in Sylhet in 1956. He earned his bachelor's in chemical engineering from Ahsanullah Engineering College (later Bangladesh University of Engineering and Technology) in 1960. He got his master's and Ph.D. degrees from University of Manchester in 1962 and 1964 respectively.

Career
Mahmud joined as an assistant professor in Bangladesh University of Engineering and Technology in October 1964. He served as vice-chancellor from November 27, 1996, to October 14, 1998. He retired as a professor at the Department of Chemical Engineering in September 2000.

Mahmud served as the Minister of State for Agriculture and Forests for the Government of Bangladesh during 1979 to 1981. He served as the chairman of Grameen Bank during 1980–1989. He was a member of Bangladesh University Grants commission during 1996–1997.

Mahmud is serving as a member of Academic Council of BRAC University.

He is the co-author, with Nooruddin Ahmed, of the textbook Corrosion Engineering: An Introductory Text, for undergraduate chemical engineers.

References

1940 births
Living people
Bangladeshi engineers
Bangladesh University of Engineering and Technology alumni
Academic staff of Bangladesh University of Engineering and Technology
Recipients of the Ekushey Padak
Vice-Chancellors of Bangladesh University of Engineering and Technology
Honorary Fellows of Bangla Academy
State Ministers of Agriculture (Bangladesh)
State Ministers of Environment and Forests (Bangladesh)